Hines is an unincorporated community in Cook County, Illinois, United States. It is located in Proviso Township next to the villages of Broadview, Maywood, Forest Park, and North Riverside.

Government and infrastructure
The United States Postal Service operates the Hines Office at 220 Scott Drive.

The Edward Hines, Jr. VA Hospital, administered by the United States Department of Veterans Affairs, is located at 5000 South Fifth Avenue in Hines.

References

Unincorporated communities in Illinois
Chicago metropolitan area
Unincorporated communities in Cook County, Illinois